Noriphoca is an extinct genus of phocid belonging to the subfamily Monachinae. It is known from the late Oligocene to early Miocene of Italy.

Species
The type species of Noriphoca, N. gaudini, was originally named Phoca gaudini on the basis of a skull from late Oligocene to earliest Miocene deposits in Chiento, Italy. Later authors referred it to either Monotherium, Pristiphoca, or the physeteroid genus Paleophoca. However, it was later shown that P. gaudini cannot be referred to Monotherium as the latter was probably phocine and not monachine, and erected Noriphoca for the stem-monachine species P. gaudini.

References

Miocene pinnipeds
Prehistoric carnivoran genera
Monachines
Chattian first appearances
Aquitanian extinctions
Prehistoric pinnipeds of Europe
Fossil taxa described in 2018